John Wanton (December 24, 1672 – July 5, 1740)  was a governor of the Colony of Rhode Island and Providence Plantations, serving for six consecutive terms from 1734 to 1740. He was the son of Edward Wanton who was a ship builder, and who became a Quaker after witnessing the persecution of these people, also becoming a preacher of that religion.  Edward Wanton had lived in York, Maine; Boston, Massachusetts; and Scituate, Massachusetts before coming to Rhode Island.

John Wanton was a merchant, and like his father was a Quaker, and the Friends' records state that "for many years he was a valuable public friend."  He first entered public service in 1706 as a deputy from Newport serving for several years in that capacity, and also as the Speaker of the House of Deputies. He was called Colonel John Wanton in 1706 when he went after French privateers with John Dublin, who was wounded in the action.  Between 1721 and 1734 Wanton was the Deputy Governor for the colony, and following the death of his brother, William Wanton, he became governor in 1734, serving continuously until his own death in 1740. He was buried in the Coddington Cemetery in Newport.

Wanton was married to Mary Stover, the daughter of Sylvester and Elizabeth (Norton) Stover of Cape Neddick, York County, Maine, and had five children.  Wanton's brother, William Wanton, preceded him as governor, and his nephews Gideon Wanton and Joseph Wanton were later governors of the colony.

See also

 List of colonial governors of Rhode Island
 Colony of Rhode Island and Providence Plantations

References

Bibliography

External links
Chronological list of Rhode Island leaders

1672 births
1740 deaths
18th-century Quakers
Colonial governors of Rhode Island
Politicians from Newport, Rhode Island
People of colonial Rhode Island
Burials at Coddington Cemetery